Vernonia flaccidifolia is a species of flowering plant in the family Asteraceae. It is native to Georgia, Tennessee, and Alabama.

References 

flaccidifolia
Flora of Georgia (U.S. state)
Flora of Alabama
Flora of Tennessee